Versão Acústica 4 is the seventh studio album by Brazilian acoustic rock cover musician Emmerson Nogueira.

Track listing

References

2009 albums
Emmerson Nogueira albums
Sony Music Brazil albums